In computing, a GLX visual is a set of attributes that define a mode in which OpenGL programs can write to an X window with GLX. A list of GLX visuals can be found with the command "glxinfo". Programs can get a GLX visual matching the desired properties with glXChooseVisual. In principle, a GLX visual is an X visual augmented with ancillary buffer information.

An error message that has puzzled many an X user is "Couldn't find matching GLX visual" (or similar) — it means that the program tried to use a GLX visual that was not available on that X server. A possible solution is to change the color depth to something that supports the requested capabilities.

See also 

X visual

External links 
 GLX visuals

X-based libraries